The 1983–84 Segunda División season saw 20 teams participate in the second flight Spanish league. Hércules CF, Racing de Santander and Elche CF were promoted to Primera División. Linares CF, Algeciras CF, Palencia CF and Rayo Vallecano were relegated to Segunda División B.

Teams

Final table

Results

Segunda División seasons
2
Spain